Hajji Hasan may refer to:
 Hajji Hasan, Golestan
 Hajji Hasan, Kurdistan
 Hajji Hasan, Maku, West Azerbaijan Province
 Hajji Hasan, Miandoab, West Azerbaijan Province
 Hajji Hasan-e Khaleseh, Miandoab County, West Azerbaijan Province
 Hajji Hasan-e Olya, West Azerbaijan Province

See also
 Hajj Hasan (disambiguation)